Mengistu Haile Mariam (born 21 May 1937) is an Ethiopian politician and former army officer who was the head of state of Ethiopia from 1977 to 1991 and General Secretary of the Workers' Party of Ethiopia from 1984 to 1991. He was the chairman of the Derg, the socialist military junta that governed Ethiopia, from 1977 to 1987, and the president of the People's Democratic Republic of Ethiopia (PDRE) from 1987 to 1991. 

The Derg took power in the Ethiopian Revolution following the overthrow of Emperor Haile Selassie I in 1974, marking the end of the Solomonic dynasty which had ruled Ethiopia since the 13th century. Mengistu purged rivals for power from the Derg and made himself dictator of Ethiopia, attempting to modernize the feudal economy of Ethiopia through Marxist-Leninist-inspired policies such as nationalization and land redistribution. His bloody consolidation of power in 1977–1978 is known as the Ethiopian Red Terror, a brutal crackdown on opposition groups and civilians following a failed assassination attempt by the Ethiopian People's Revolutionary Party (EPRP) in September 1976, after it had ignored the Derg's invitation to join the union of socialist parties. The death toll is unknown but is often estimated at between 30,000 and 750,000.

Internal rebellion, government repression, and economic mismanagement characterized Mengistu's presidency, the Red Terror period being a battle for dominance between the Derg, the EPRP, and their rival the All-Ethiopia Socialist Movement (MEISON), who had initially aligned themselves with the Derg. While this internal conflict was being fought, Ethiopia was threatened by both the Somali invasion and the guerrilla campaign of the Eritrean People's Liberation Front, who demanded independence for Eritrea, then a province of Ethiopia. The Ogaden War of 1977–1978 over a disputed border region (Ogaden) with Somalia was notable for the prominent role of Mengistu's Soviet and Cuban allies in securing an Ethiopian victory. The catastrophic famine of 1983–1985 is what brought his government the most international attention.

Mengistu fled to Zimbabwe in May 1991 after the PDRE National Shengo dissolved itself and called for a transitional government. His departure brought an abrupt end to the Ethiopian Civil War. Mengistu Haile Mariam still lives in Harare, Zimbabwe, despite an Ethiopian court verdict which found him guilty of genocide in absentia. Mengistu's government is estimated to be responsible for the deaths of 500,000 to 2,000,000 Ethiopians, mostly during the 1983–1985 famine in Ethiopia.

Early life
Mengistu Haile Mariam was born on 21 May 1937 in Jimma during the Italian occupation. Mengistu was the son of a former Konso slave who worked for an aristocratic Shewan landowner Afenegus Eshete Geda, who encountered Mengistu's father, Haile Mariam Wolde Ayana, while he was on a hunting expedition in the Konso district, then under the governorship of Dejazmatch Taye Gulilat. After the Italians invaded Ethiopia, they abolished slavery, freeing Haile Mariam. The Italians then recruited Haile Mariam as an Askari soldier and sent him to Jimma. Here, Mengistu's mother who was also former servant of Konso origin met Haile Mariam and the two got married. The marriage resulted with the birth of Mengistu's elder sister, and then Mengistu himself. 

After the Italians left the country in 1941, the couple moved to Debre Markos where Haile Mariam joined Haile Selassie's fledgling army and received the rank of corporal. Corporal Haile Mariam was then transferred to the ammunition's production unit of the imperial army in Addis Ababa. Mengistu was raised in the household of Dejazmatch Kebede Tesemma (the former governor of Gojjam), where Mengistu's mother worked as a servant. In Debre Markos, Mengistu attended the Negus Tekle Haimanot School where he was known to be a problematic teenager and not serious with his studies, he was later expelled from high school for misbehavior. Mengistu then joined the army at a very young age.

Army life
As an ambitious young soldier, he attracted the attention of the Eritrean-born General Aman Andom, who raised him to the rank of sergeant and assigned him duties as an errand boy in his office. Aman then recommended him to the Holetta Military Academy, one of the two important military academies of Ethiopia. After Mengistu graduated from the Holetta Military Academy in 1957, he received the rank of Second Lieutenant. General Aman then became his mentor, and when the General was assigned to the commander of the Third Division took Mengistu with him to Harar, and later was assigned as an ordnance officer in the Third Division. He was subsequently sent to the US for the first time in 1964 to the Savanna Army Depot in Illinois for an Ordnance testing course for six months. 

Aman was abruptly transferred to Addis Ababa. The imperial regime found him too popular with the soldiers especially after his commendable military exploits in the engagement against the Somali army at Tog Wuchale in 1963. Prime Minister Aklilu Habte Wold removed the general affectionately known to his men as "the desert lion" from army duties and assigned him as a senator, a job he hated very much as he recounted to his author, but could not refuse without arousing the Emperor's ire. Aman's replacement was General Haile Baikedagn, who found Mengistu an intriguer and a very dangerous young officer. General Haile had actually written a secret report to his superiors to put a close watch on Mengistu and not give him a raise in the military ranks. A few years before his second departure for training to the US he was in conflict with the then Third Division commander General Haile Baykedagn whose policy of strict discipline and order did not sit well with Mengistu. At the time, the ordnance group was offered military technical training support in the US. Despite his disapproval of Mengistu's insubordination and disrespect, the General was obliged to release him and Mengistu went for an 18-month training program at the Aberdeen Proving Ground in Maryland, United States. He also took some night classes at the University of Maryland, making him fluent in English. He returned for a third time in 1970, this time as a student at the Combined Arms Center in Fort Leavenworth, Kansas. Returning after his training, he was expected to command the ordnance sub-division in Harar, but was prevented by General Haile Baykedagn who cited his previous insubordination. Years later, Mengistu would murder General Haile Baykedagn along with 60 ministers and generals.

Mengistu typically endured derogatory comments about his appearance, rooted in his Konso background. His features were far more "negroid" than the average highlander Ethiopian, which Paul Henze believes gave him an inferiority complex. Henze also notes that while receiving military training in the United States, Mengistu experienced racial discrimination which led him to develop a strong anti-American sentiment, but Henze was unable to find any evidence of such incidents. When he took power, and attended the meeting of Derg members at the Fourth Division headquarters in Addis Ababa, Mengistu exclaimed with emotion:
In this country, some aristocratic families automatically categorize persons with dark skin, thick lips, and kinky hair as "Barias" (Amharic for slave)... let it be clear to everybody that I shall soon make these ignoramuses stoop and grind corn! 

Bahru Zewde notes that Mengistu was distinguished by a "special ability to size up situations and persons". Although Bahru notes that some observers "rather charitably" equated this ability with intelligence, the academic believes this skill is more akin to "street smarts": "it is rather closer to the mark to see it as inner-city smartness (or what in local parlance would be called aradanat)."

The rise of the Derg

Emperor Haile Selassie's government, having lost the confidence of the Ethiopian public following a drought and crop failures in Wollo province, was overthrown in the Ethiopian revolution of 1974. As a result, power came into the hands of a committee of low-ranking officers and enlisted soldiers led by Atnafu Abate, which came to be known as the Derg. Mengistu was originally one of the lesser members, officially sent to represent the Third Division because his commander, General Nega Tegnegn, considered him a trouble-maker and wanted to get rid of him. Between July and September 1974 through sheer demagoguery and political intrigues, Mengistu succeeded to outmaneuver all officers who stood in his way and climbed the political ladder. Mengistu and Atnafu Abate were the deputy chairmen of Derg from March 1975 to February 1977. 

Haile Selassie was strangled in 1975. It is rumored that Mengistu smothered the Emperor using a pillowcase, but Mengistu has denied these rumors. Though several groups were involved in the overthrow, the Derg succeeded to power. There is no doubt that the Derg under Mengistu's leadership ordered the execution without trial of 61 ex-officials of the Imperial government on 23 November 1974, and later of numerous other former nobles and officials including the Patriarch of the Ethiopian Orthodox Church, Abuna Theophilos, in 1977. Mengistu himself has acknowledged that the Derg ordered these deaths but refuses to accept personal responsibility. Members of the Derg have contradicted him in interviews given from prison, saying he conspired and was in full agreement with their decisions.

Leadership of Ethiopia
Mengistu did not emerge as the leader of the Derg until after the 3 February 1977 shootout, in which Chairman Tafari Benti was killed. The vice-chairman of the Derg, Atnafu Abate, clashed with Mengistu over the issue of how to handle the war in Eritrea and lost, leading to his execution with 40 other officers, clearing the way for Mengistu to assume control. He formally assumed power as head of state, and justified his execution of Abate (on 13 November of that year) by claiming that he had "placed the interests of Ethiopia above the interests of socialism" and undertaken other "counter-revolutionary" activities. Under Mengistu, Ethiopia received aid from the Soviet Union, other members of the Warsaw Pact, and Cuba.

Political conflicts

Resistance against the Derg ensued, led primarily by the Ethiopian People's Revolutionary Party (EPRP). Mengistu cracked down on the EPRP and other revolutionary student organizations in what would become called the "Red Terror". The Derg subsequently turned against the socialist student movement MEISON, a major supporter against the EPRP, in what would be called the "White Terror".

The EPRP's efforts to discredit and undermine the Derg and its MEISON collaborators escalated in the fall of 1976. It targeted public buildings and other symbols of state authority for bombings and assassinated numerous Abyot Seded and MEISON members, as well as public officials at all levels. The Derg, which countered with its own counter-terrorism campaign, labeled the EPRP's tactics the White Terror. Mengistu asserted that all "progressives" were given "freedom of action" in helping root out the revolution's enemies, and his wrath was particularly directed toward the EPRP. Peasants, workers, public officials, and even students thought to be loyal to the Mengistu regime were provided with arms to accomplish this task.

In a public speech in April 1977, Mengistu shouted "Death to counterrevolutionaries! Death to the EPRP!" and then produced three bottles filled with a red liquid that symbolized the blood of the imperialists and the counterrevolutionaries and smashed them to the ground to show what the revolution would do to its enemies. Thousands of young men and women turned up dead in the streets of the capital and other cities in the following months. They were systematically murdered mainly by the militia attached to the kebeles, the neighborhood watch committees which served during Mengistu's reign as the lowest level local government and security surveillance units. Families had to pay the kebeles a tax known as "the wasted bullet" to obtain the bodies of their loved ones. In May 1977, the Swedish general secretary of the Save the Children Fund stated that "1,000 children have been killed, and their bodies are left in the streets and are being eaten by wild hyenas. You can see the heaped-up bodies of murdered children, most of them aged eleven to thirteen, lying in the gutter, as you drive out of Addis Ababa."

Military gains made by the monarchist Ethiopian Democratic Union in Begemder were rolled back when that party split just as it was on the verge of capturing the old capital of Gondar. The army of the Somali Democratic Republic invaded Ethiopia, having overrun the Ogaden region, and was on the verge of capturing Harar and Dire Dawa, when Somalia's erstwhile allies, the Soviets and the Cubans, launched an unprecedented arms and personnel airlift to come to rescue of Ethiopia. The Derg government turned back the Somali invasion and made deep strides against the Eritrean secessionists and the Tigray People's Liberation Front (TPLF) as well. By the end of the seventies, Mengistu presided over the second-largest army in all of sub-Saharan Africa, as well as a formidable air force and navy.

Amnesty International estimates that up to 500,000 people were killed during the Ethiopian Red Terror.

Embracing Marxism–Leninism

In the 1970s, Mengistu embraced the philosophy of Marxism–Leninism, which was increasingly popular among many nationalists and revolutionaries throughout Africa and much of the Third World at the time. In the mid-1970s, under Mengistu's leadership, the Derg regime began an aggressive program of changing system of Ethiopia from a mixed feudal-capitalist emergent economy to an Eastern Bloc-style command economy. Shortly after coming to power, all rural land was nationalized, stripping the Ethiopian Church, the Imperial family, and the nobility of all their sizable estates and the bulk of their wealth. During this same period, all foreign-owned and locally owned companies were nationalized without compensation in an effort to redistribute the country's wealth. All undeveloped urban property and all rental property were also nationalized. Private businesses such as banks and insurance companies, large retail businesses, etc. were also taken over by the government. All this nationalized property was brought under the administration of large bureaucracies set up to administer them. Farmers who had once worked on land owned by absentee landlords were now compelled to join collective farms. All agricultural products were no longer to be offered on the free market but were to be controlled and distributed by the government. Despite progressive agricultural reforms, under the Derg, agricultural output suffered due to civil war, drought and misguided economic policies. There was also a famine in 1984, which was the 10th anniversary of the Derg.

The Soviets hailed Ethiopia for its supposed similar cultural and historical parallels to the USSR. Moscow said it proved that a backward society could become revolutionary by adopting a Leninist system. It was hailed as a model junior ally that Moscow was eager to support. In the 1980s Ethiopia plunged into greater turmoil and the Soviet system itself was collapsing by 1990. Russian commentators had turned scornful of the Ethiopian regime.

In early 1984, under Mengistu's direction, the Marxist–Leninist Worker's Party of Ethiopia (WPE) was founded as the country's ruling party, with Mengistu as general secretary. On 10 September 1987, a new Soviet-style constitution was adopted, and the country was renamed the People's Democratic Republic of Ethiopia. Mengistu became president, with sweeping executive and legislative powers. Due to the doctrine of democratic centralism, he was effectively a dictator. He and the other surviving members of the Derg all retired from the military. However, even as civilians, they dominated the Politburo of the WPE. In the late 1980s, some Western critics of Mengistu, including Michael Johns of The Heritage Foundation, charged that Mengistu's economic, military and political policies, along with the Soviet Union's support for Mengistu, were key contributing factors to the mid-1980s Ethiopian famine, which ultimately took over 500,000 lives. Mengistu made seven visits to the Soviet Union between 1977 and 1984, as well as other visits to his political allies Cuba, East Germany, South Yemen, and Mozambique. From 1983 to 1984 Mengistu served as head of the Organization of African Unity.

However, the government's military position gradually weakened. First came the Battle of Afabet in March 1989, a defeat at the hands of the Eritrean People's Liberation Front, with 15,000 casualties and the loss of a great deal of equipment. This was followed up less than a year later by another crushing defeat at Shire, with over 20,000 men either killed or captured and the loss of even more equipment. On 16 May 1989, while Mengistu was out of the country for a four-day state visit to East Germany, senior military officials attempted a coup, and the Minister of Defense, Haile Giyorgis Habte Mariam, was killed; Mengistu returned within 24 hours and nine generals, including the air force commander and the army chief of staff, died as the coup was crushed.

Removal from power; asylum in Zimbabwe
By 1990, the Soviet Union had all but ended its support for Mengistu's regime. In May 1991, the Ethiopian People's Revolutionary Democratic Front (EPRDF) forces advanced on Addis Ababa from all sides, and Mengistu fled the country with 50 family and Derg members. He was granted asylum in Zimbabwe as an official guest of Zimbabwean President Robert Mugabe. Although Mugabe was removed from power in 2017, no new extradition requests have been submitted.

Mengistu left behind almost the entire membership of the original Derg and the WPE leadership. The regime only survived without him for another week before the EPRDF streamed into the capital, precluding the previous leadership's escape. Almost all were promptly arrested and put on trial upon the assumption of power by the EPRDF. Mengistu has claimed that the takeover of his country resulted from the policies of Mikhail Gorbachev, who in his view allowed the dissolution of the Soviet Union and the termination of its aid to Ethiopia.

An assassination attempt against Mengistu occurred on 4 November 1995, while he was out walking with his wife, Wubanchi Bishaw, near his home in the Gunhill suburb of Harare. While Mengistu was unharmed, his alleged attacker, Solomon Haile Ghebre Michael, an Eritrean, was shot and arrested by Mengistu's bodyguards. He was later tried for this assassination attempt, pleading not guilty in a Zimbabwean court on 8 July 1996. The Eritrean Ambassador to South Africa, Tsegaye Tesfa Tsion, flew to Harare to attend the trial. The attacker was sentenced to ten years in prison, while his accomplice Abraham Goletom Joseph, who had been arrested in a police raid, was sentenced to five years. They said that they had been tortured under Mengistu, and on appeal, their sentences were reduced to two years each due to "mitigatory circumstances". The Ethiopian ambassador to Zimbabwe, Fantahun Haile Michael, said his government was not involved in the assassination attempt, and that he heard about the incident from the media.

, Mengistu still resided in Zimbabwe, despite the Ethiopian government's desire that he be extradited. He is said to live in luxurious circumstances, and it is claimed that he advised Mugabe on security matters; according to Zimbabwean intelligence sources, he proposed the idea of clearing slums, which was implemented as Operation Murambatsvina in 2005, and chaired meetings at which the operation was planned. However, the State Security Minister Didymus Mutasa strongly denied that Mengistu was involved in Operation Murambatsvina.

In 2018, the former prime minister of Ethiopia Hailemariam Desalegn published a photo of himself meeting with Mengistu. He withdrew the photo after criticism.

Genocide trial

Mengistu was charged by the Ethiopian government led by Meles Zenawi, in absentia, for the killing of nearly 2,000 people. The charge sheet and evidence list for his crimes were 8,000 pages long. The evidence against him included signed execution orders, videos of torture sessions, and personal testimony.
The trial began in 1994 and ended in 2006. The court found Mengistu guilty as charged on 12 December 2006, and imposed a life sentence in January 2007. In addition to the genocide conviction, the court found him guilty of imprisonment, illegal homicide, and illegal confiscation of property. Michael Clough, a US attorney and longtime observer of Ethiopia, said in a statement:
 “The biggest problem with prosecuting Mengistu for genocide is that his actions did not necessarily target a particular group. They were directed against anybody who was opposing his government, and they were generally much more political than based on any ethnic targeting.
Some experts believe hundreds of thousands of university students, intellectuals, and politicians (including Emperor Haile Selassie) were killed during Mengistu's rule. Amnesty International estimates that a total of half a million people were killed during the Red Terror of 1977 and 1978. Human Rights Watch describes the Red Terror as "one of the most systematic uses of mass murder by a state ever witnessed in Africa." During his reign it was not uncommon to see students, suspected government critics, or rebel sympathizers hanging from lampposts each morning. Mengistu himself is alleged to have murdered opponents by garroting or shooting them, saying that he was leading by example. Estimates of the number of deaths for which he was responsible range from 500,000 to over 2,000,000.

106 Derg officials were accused of genocide during the trials, but only 36 of them were present in the court. Several former members of the Derg have been sentenced to death. After Mengistu's conviction in December 2006, the Zimbabwean government said that he still enjoyed asylum and would not be extradited. A Zimbabwean government spokesman explained this by saying that "Mengistu and his government played a key and commendable role during our struggle for independence". According to the spokesman, Mengistu assisted Zimbabwean guerrilla fighters during the Rhodesian Bush War by providing training and arms; after the war, he had provided training for Zimbabwean air force pilots. The spokesman said that "not many countries have shown such commitment to us".

Following an appeal on 26 May 2008, Mengistu was sentenced to death in absentia by Ethiopia's High Court, overturning his previous sentence of life imprisonment. Twenty-three of his most senior aides also received death sentences that were commuted on 1 June 2011. As of 4 October 2011, 16 former Mengistu officials have been released from prison on parole, due to their old age and good behavior while incarcerated. However, Mengistu's sentence remained unchanged.

Memoirs
In 2010, Mengistu announced the publication of his memoirs. In early 2012, a manuscript of the memoir, entitled Tiglatchin ("Our Struggle" in Amharic), was leaked onto the internet. Some months later the first leaked volume was published in the United States, and in 2016 the second volume followed. This time it was published in Ethiopia. Mengistu accused the remnants of the EPRP of leaking the first volume to sabotage his publication.

Personal life
Mengistu married Wubanchi Bishaw in 1968. They have a son, Andinet, and daughters, Tigist and Timihirt. Mengistu has resided in Zimbabwe, due to his friendship with Robert Mugabe, ever since 1991.

Mengistu's grandmother, Totit, was still alive when he seized power, and had become an Orthodox nun. Supposedly, on the special orders of her grandson, the nationalization of land did not apply to her. She continued to own the land near the Oletta Military Academy just 30 miles from Addis Ababa, which Empress Zewditu had granted her for services prior to her expulsion from the palace in 1928. Popular legend however states that the elderly nun did not thank her grandson for this favor, and used to curse him for deposing the Emperor.

Notes

References

Further reading
 Andrew, Christopher M. and Mitrokhin, Vasili. The World Was Going Our Way: The KGB and the Battle for the Third World. Basic Books, 2005. 
 Coppa, Frank. 2006. "Mengistu Haile Mariam". Encyclopedia of Modern Dictators: From Napoleon to the Present, Frank Coppa, ed., pp. 181–183. Peter Lang Publishing. .
 Applebaum, Anne (foreword) and Hollander, Paul (introduction PDF file and editor) From the Gulag to the Killing Fields: Personal Accounts of Political Violence and Repression in Communist States. Intercollegiate Studies Institute (2006). .
 Courtois, Stephane; Werth, Nicolas; Panne, Jean-Louis; Paczkowski, Andrzej; Bartosek, Karel; Margolin, Jean-Louis & Kramer, Mark (1999).
 Orizio, Riccardo. Talk of the Devil: Encounters with Seven Dictators. Walker & Company, 2004. 
 Ulrich Schmid. Aschemenschen. Berlin, 2006 
 Taffara Deguefé, A Tripping Stone: Ethiopian Prison Diary, Addis Ababa University Press, Addis Ababa, 2003.
 Scott Rempell, "Five Grounds: A Novel ", .
 Aryeh Y. Yodfat, "The Soviet Union and the Horn of Africa", Northeast African Studies (1980) 2#2 pp. 65–81 online

External links

 "Mengistu defends Red Terror", BBC News, 28 December 1999.
 "A U.S. Strategy to Foster Human Rights in Ethiopia" , by Michael Johns, Heritage Foundation Backgrounder # 692, 23 February 1989.
 "Ethiopian Dictator Mengistu Haile Mariam", Human Rights Watch, 29 November 1999.
 . Reuters, 2007

1937 births
Ethiopian atheists
Ethiopian former Christians
Anti-Americanism
Ethiopian communists
Collaborators with the Soviet Union
Ethiopian exiles
Ethiopian people convicted of crimes against humanity
Ethiopian people convicted of genocide
People of the Eritrean War of Independence
Exiled politicians
Leaders who took power by coup
Living people
Presidents of Ethiopia
People from Addis Ababa
People sentenced to death in absentia
Collars of the Order of the White Lion
Workers' Party of Ethiopia politicians
Politicide perpetrators
Fugitives wanted on war crimes charges
Ethiopian politicians convicted of crimes
People from Southern Nations, Nationalities, and Peoples' Region
Genocide perpetrators
People of the Cold War
20th-century criminals
People from Wolayita Zone
People of the Ethiopian Civil War
20th-century Ethiopian politicians